St Thomas School may refer to:
 St Thomas School, Kalyan
 St Thomas School, Kolkata
 St. Thomas' School, Leipzig
 St Thomas College, Lucknow
 St Thomas Secondary School, Pahang, Malaysia
 St Thomas Primary School, Pahang, Malaysia
 St Thomas Secondary School, Sarawak, Malaysia
 St Thomas Primary School, Sarawak, Malaysia

See also 
 St. Thomas Aquinas Secondary School (disambiguation)